Mount Balbi is a Holocene stratovolcano located in the northern portion of the island of Bougainville, Papua New Guinea. There are five volcanic craters east of the summit, one of which contains a crater lake. The summit is composed of coalesced cones and lava domes which host a large solfatera field. There are numerous fumaroles near the craters, though Balbi has not erupted in historic time.

See also
 List of volcanoes in Papua New Guinea
 List of Ultras of Oceania

References

 
 Bagana Volcano and Balbi Volcano, Bougainville Island

Mountains of Papua New Guinea
Volcanoes of Bougainville Island
Stratovolcanoes of Papua New Guinea
Volcanic crater lakes
Holocene stratovolcanoes
Inactive volcanoes